The North American Leaders' Summit (NALS), called the Three Amigos Summit in the English language popular press and Cumbre de Los Tres Amigos in Spanish, is the trilateral summit between the prime minister of Canada, the president of Mexico, and the president of the United States. The summits were initially held as part of the Security and Prosperity Partnership of North America (SPP), a continent-level dialogue between the three countries established in 2005, and continued after SPP became inactive in 2009.

The most recent North American Leaders' Summit was hosted by Mexican president Andrés Manuel López Obrador on January 10, 2023 in Mexico City.

Meetings 
Until 2009, the summits were held as part of the wider Security and Prosperity Partnership of North America. There are no fixed dates for the summits and in some years a summit has not been held for varying reasons. In 2011, the summit was postponed out of respect for the bereavement of the Mexican government after the death of Mexican Interior Minister Francisco Blake Mora, and in 2015, Prime Minister of Canada Stephen Harper cancelled the Three Amigos summit as a political statement to protest U.S. President Barack Obama's push against the Keystone XL oil pipeline.

During the Trump administration from 2017 to 2021, no official summits were held. The leaders of the three countries continued to meet at other events, such as the signing of the United States–Mexico–Canada Agreement during the 2018 G20 Buenos Aires summit.

Photo gallery

See also 
Bilateral relations
Canada–United States relations
Mexico–United States relations
Canada–Mexico relations

Trilateral relations
 North American Free Trade Agreement
 United States–Mexico–Canada Agreement
 Security and Prosperity Partnership of North America, predecessor to NALS
 North American Union, a theoretical economic and political union of the three countries

Notes

References

External links 
 NALS 2016 website

Trilateral relations of Canada, Mexico, and the United States
Lists of United States presidential visits
Diplomatic visits by heads of state
Diplomatic visits by heads of government
Recurring events established in 2005
Diplomatic conferences